Live at Maybeck Recital Hall, Volume Twelve is an album of solo performances by jazz pianist Barry Harris, recorded in 1990.

Music and recording
The album was recorded in March 1990 at the Maybeck Recital Hall in Berkeley, California. The performances are chiefly bebop-based, although some of the compositions are not.

Release and reception

Live at Maybeck Recital Hall, Volume Twelve was released by Concord Records. The Penguin Guide to Jazz wrote that Harris "finds just the right pace and programme".

Track listing
"It Could Happen to You"
"All God's Chillun Got Rhythm"
"She"
"Cherokee"
"Gone Again"
"Lucky Day"
"It Never Entered My Mind/Meet the Flintstones/I Love Lucy"
"Would You Like to Take a Walk?"
"I'll Keep Loving You"
"Parker's Mood"

Personnel
Barry Harris – piano

References

1990 live albums
Albums recorded at the Maybeck Recital Hall
Concord Records live albums
Solo piano jazz albums